Live at the Aquarius Theatre: The First Performance is a double live album by American rock band the Doors. It was recorded at the Aquarius Theatre in Hollywood on July 21, 1969. The album contains the band's first performance that day. The second show can be found on Live at the Aquarius Theatre: The Second Performance.

The album was released from the Bright Midnight Archives collection which contains a number of previously unreleased live concerts by the Doors.

Track listing
All songs written by the Doors except where noted.

Disc one
Tuning - 1:09
Jim's Introduction - 0:54
Back Door Man (Willie Dixon, Chester Burnett) - 5:38
Break On Through (To the Other Side) (Jim Morrison) - 4:49
What Do We Do Next? - 0:18
Soul Kitchen (Morrison) - 4:44
You Make Me Real (Morrison) - 3:11
Tuning - 1:09
I Will Never Be Untrue (Morrison) - 3:50
The Crowd Humbly Requests - 0:59
When the Music's Over - 11:32
Universal Mind (Morrison) - 4:39
The Crowd Requests Their Favorites and Tuning - 1:20
Mystery Train/Crossroads (Junior Parker)/(Robert Johnson) - 6:45
Build Me a Woman (Morrison) - 5:35

Disc two
Tuning - 0:37
Who Do You Love? (False Start) (Bo Diddley) - 0:37
Who Do You Love? (Diddley) - 7:27
Light My Fire (Robby Krieger), (Morrison) - 10:53
The Crowd Requests More - 1:15
Celebration of the Lizard (Morrison) - 15:28

Personnel
Jim Morrison - vocals
Ray Manzarek - organ, keyboard bass
Robby Krieger - electric guitar
John Densmore - drums
Bruce Botnick - production and mastering

References

2001 live albums
Albums produced by Bruce Botnick
Albums recorded at the Aquarius Theater
Bright Midnight Archives